Serendipity is a 2001 American romantic comedy film directed by Peter Chelsom, written by Marc Klein, and starring John Cusack and Kate Beckinsale. The film grossed $77.5 million on a $28 million budget.

Plot
While Christmas shopping at Bloomingdale's in New York City, Jonathan Trager meets Sara Thomas when both try to buy the same pair of gloves. Despite both being in relationships, a mutual attraction leads them to have dessert at a restaurant called Serendipity 3 where Sara explains that she lets fate's "little signals" determine many of her life decisions. After separating, they meet again when each returns to the restaurant to retrieve something they forgot. Jonathan convinces Sara to give him her number, but when the wind blows it out of his grasp, Sara thinks it is fate telling them to back off. Jonathan disagrees, and Sara decides to let fate reunite them: she has Jonathan write his number on a five dollar bill then uses it to buy breath mints and promises to sell her copy of Love in the Time of Cholera in which she will write her name and number. As one last experiment, Sara tosses Jonathan one of the gloves, they board separate elevators in the Waldorf Astoria and agree that if they arrive on the same floor, they are meant to be together. They each pick the same floor, but Jonathan is delayed because a child on his elevator presses random buttons, leading her to believe that the experiment failed.

Years later, Jonathan is an ESPN producer engaged to Halley and Sara is a therapist living in San Francisco, engaged to a musician, Lars. Jonathan runs across his  glove and goes out with his friend Dean to find Sara. Meanwhile, Sara, stressed by the wedding planning and Lars’ focus on an upcoming world tour, travels to New York with her best friend Eve to find Jonathan. After nearly crossing paths with Jonathan throughout the day, Eve and Sara have dessert at Serendipity where Eve convinces Sara to give up--but Eve's change contains the 5 dollar bill with Jonathan's number. They catch the same cab Jonathan and Dean rode in earlier. After finding that a bridal shop next to Serendipity now houses a roommate finder service Sara once used, Jonathan sees it as a sign that he should marry Halley.

At the Waldorf Astoria, Eve and Sara encounter Halley headed to the wedding rehearsal. Halley invites Eve to join her since they were friends in college, but Sara declines. Outside their room, she finds an apologetic Lars.

At the rehearsal, Jonathan’s distracted demeanor frustrates Halley who pleads with him to focus on the wedding. Halley then gives him Sara's copy of Love in the Time of Cholera, containing her phone number as a wedding gift. Jonathan and Dean get her address and fly to San Francisco. Once there, they see Sara's sister and her boyfriend having sex and assume it is Sara in a happy relationship. Dean helps Jonathan realize that he shouldn’t marry Halley while Sara decides to end her engagement to Lars.

The next day, Sara finds the 5 dollar bill with Jonathan's number on it, having gotten hers and Eve's wallets mixed up. After getting his address and being told by the building superintendent of his wedding at the Waldorf, Sara hurries there and is relieved to find the ceremony has been cancelled.

Dean reassures Jonathan that he did the right thing and vows to be more spontaneous in his own marriage, which has been on the rocks. Jonathan wanders to the same ice skating rink where he spent part of his evening with Sara ten years earlier and finds a leather jacket on a bench. As it begins to snow, he lies on his back in the middle of the rink with the jacket as a pillow next to one of the pair of  gloves. When the matching glove lands on his chest, he sits up and finds Sara watching him, having come to claim her jacket. They introduce themselves and finally share a kiss.

They celebrate their anniversary at Bloomingdale’s in front of the display of gloves where they met.

Cast

 John Cusack as Jonathan Trager
 Kate Beckinsale as Sara Thomas
 Molly Shannon as Eve
 Bridget Moynahan as Halley Buchanan
 Jeremy Piven as Dean Kansky
 John Corbett as Lars Hammond
 Eugene Levy as Bloomingdale's salesman (Macall Polay)
 Marcia Bennett as Mrs. Trager
 Eve Crawford as Mrs. Buchanan
 Evan Neuman as Kenny
 Buck Henry (uncredited) as himself
 Lucy Gordon as Caroline Mitchell (Sara's sister)
 Kevin Rice as Kip Mitchell
 Gary Gerbrandt as Josh

Production
Serendipity was shot in New Jersey, New York City, Ontario, and San Francisco, California in the summer of 2000. Following the 9/11 attacks, images of the World Trade Center towers were digitally removed from all skyline shots of New York City. Jennifer Aniston was offered the role of Sara Thomas but turned it down to avoid being type-cast in romantic comedies. Carla Gugino and Claire Forlani auditioned for the role of Sara Thomas.

Release 
Serendipity premiered at the 2001 Toronto International Film Festival.  The film opened at #2 at the U.S. box office earning $13,309,241 in its opening weekend, behind Training Day. With an estimated budget of $28 million, this was the first of Chelsom's films to turn a profit. After some of the biggest commercial failures of all time (Town & Country), Serendipity marked the first of several box-office successes for Chelsom, peaking in 2009 with Hannah Montana: The Movie. The film grossed $50,294,317 in the domestic box office and $27,221,987 internationally for a worldwide total of $77,516,304.

Reception
The site's consensus states: "Light and charming, Serendipity could benefit from less contrivances." On Metacritic, the film has a weighted average score of 52 out of 100 from 33 critics, indicating "mixed or average reviews". Audiences polled by CinemaScore gave the film an average grade of "B+" on an A+ to F scale.

Roger Ebert gave the film 1½ out of 4 stars.
The New York Times gave it a mixed review and compared it to cinematic candyfloss.

Music

The soundtrack contains popular music by various artists, with one track from the musical score, composed and conducted by Alan Silvestri.

 "Never a Day" - Wood
 "Moonlight Kiss" - Bap Kennedy
 "January Rain" - David Gray
 "Waiting in Vain" - Annie Lennox
 "The Distance" - Evan & Jaron
 "Like Lovers Do" - Heather Nova
 "When You Know" - Shawn Colvin
 "Black Eyed Dog" - Nick Drake
 "Northern Sky" - Nick Drake
 "Cool Yule" - Louis Armstrong
 "This Year" - Chantal Kreviazuk
 "(There's) Always Something There to Remind Me" - Brian Whitman
 "'83" - John Mayer
 "Fast Forward" - Alan Silvestri
 "From Rusholme With Love" - Mint Royale 
Not included within the release of the soundtrack
 "Someone Like You" - Van Morrison
 "I'm Still in Love" - CoCo Lee (Asian movie theme song)
 "Rose Rouge" - St. Germain

See also
 Serendipity
 Missed connection, where two people want to reconnect after an initial meeting but neither has the other's contact details.
 List of Christmas films

References

External links

 
 
 

2001 films
2001 romantic comedy films
American Christmas comedy films
American romantic comedy films
Films directed by Peter Chelsom
Films scored by Alan Silvestri
Films set in New York City
Films set in San Francisco
Films shot in California
Films shot in New Jersey
Films shot in New York (state)
Films shot in San Francisco
Films shot in Toronto
Impact of the September 11 attacks on cinema
2000s Christmas comedy films
2000s English-language films
2000s American films